Count of Idanha-a-Nova was a Portuguese title of nobility created on two occasions.

The first creation, on 1 November 1582, by Philip I of Portugal.

Ttile holders:
 Pedro de Alcáçova Carneiro (1515 - 1593), 1st Count of Idanha-a-Nova, secretary of kings John III and Sebastian I of Portugal and Vedor da Fazenda of kings Sebastian I and Philip I of Portugal.
The second creation, on 17 June 1892, by Charles I of Portugal.

Title holders:
Jerónimo Trigueiros de Aragão Martel da Costa, 1st Count of Idanha-a-Nova
Joaquim Trigueiros Osório de Aragão, 2nd Count of Idanha-a-Nova
Joaquim Maria Trigueiros Coelho Frazão Osório de Aragão Martel, 3rd Count of Idanha-a-Nova; 	
 Maria de la Salette Trigueiros Coelho Frazão Osório de Aragão Martel, 4th Count of Idanha-a-Nova

See also
Idanha-a-Nova Municipality

References

Idanha-a-Nova
1892 establishments in Portugal